Jürgen Lehnert (born 2 November 1954) is an East German sprint canoer who competed in the mid to late 1970s. He won a bronze medal in the K-4 1000 m event at the 1976 Summer Olympics in Montreal.

Lehnert also won two medals in the K-4 1000 m event at the ICF Canoe Sprint World Championships with a gold in 1974 and a bronze in 1973.

References

1954 births
Canoeists at the 1976 Summer Olympics
German male canoeists
Living people
Olympic canoeists of East Germany
Olympic bronze medalists for East Germany
Olympic medalists in canoeing
ICF Canoe Sprint World Championships medalists in kayak
Medalists at the 1976 Summer Olympics